Charles Heard Jemison (born 1903) was an American Negro league pitcher in the 1930s.

A native of Walker County, Alabama, Jemison made his Negro leagues debut in 1932 with the Homestead Grays. He played for the Homestead club again in 1934, and went on to play for the Newark Dodgers in 1935.

References

External links
 and Seamheads

1903 births
Date of birth missing
Year of death missing
Place of death missing
Homestead Grays players
Newark Dodgers players